Stare Olesno  (German: Alt Rosenberg) is a village in the administrative district of Gmina Olesno, within Olesno County, Opole Voivodeship, in south-western Poland.

Notable residents
 Konrad Barde (1897–1945), general

References

Stare Olesno